The 1876 United States presidential election in Massachusetts took place on November 7, 1876, as part of the 1876 United States presidential election. Voters chose 13 representatives, or electors to the Electoral College, who voted for president and vice president.

Massachusetts voted for the Republican nominee, Rutherford B. Hayes, over the Democratic nominee, Samuel J. Tilden. Hayes won the state by a margin of 15.90%.

Results

See also
 United States presidential elections in Massachusetts

References

Massachusetts
1876
1876 Massachusetts elections